Erronea pallida, common name pale cowry, is a species of sea snail, a cowry, a marine gastropod mollusk in the family Cypraeidae, the cowries.

Description
The shell size varies between 13 mm and 34 mm. The dorsum surface is usually pale brown or greyish, with a darker brown area in the middle, while the base is whitish. It can be found under rocks in turbid or muddy waters at intertidal depth.

Distribution
This species is distributed along the Gulf of Oman, the Philippines and in the Indian Ocean along Kenya.

References

External links
 Encyclopedia of Life
 
 OBIS

pallida
Gastropods described in 1824
Taxa named by John Edward Gray